The ROTAREX Group is a privately owned Luxembourgish group of companies who develop and manufacture high pressure valves, tube fittings and pressure regulators for almost all types of gas, in almost all application fields. Founded in 1922 under the name CEODEUX in Lintgen, Luxembourg, ROTAREX currently employs approximately 1500 people and is present on all continents with a broad range of products.

Structure 
The ROTAREX Group is composed of 5 Divisions:

CEODEUX Division

CEODEUX Division is subdivided in 2 main parts:
Cylinder valves ( valves that are used for gas storage and transportation and are on a gas cylinder or storage tank)
Equipment ( Valves, Fittings, Regulators, Couplings, Filters, Hoses etc. for gas installations)

LPG Division (SRG)
All types of valves, fittings and regulators for LPG (Liquefied petroleum gas)

Firetec Division
Valves and systems for fire extinguishing

Solutions Division
Valves, pressure regulators and systems for water, beverage carbonation and other applications

Automotive Division
Valves, regulators and fittings for Automotive applications with CNG (Compressed natural gas), Hydrogen and LPG

Subcontracting Division
Machining, turning, tooling and Plastic injection

Application fields 
ROTAREX products are used in just about any application field where gas is used  Just a short list of examples: Industrial gases, breathing and medical gases, food & beverage, fire protection, cryogenics & refrigeration, laboratories, semiconductor industry, aerospace, petrochemical, automotive, welding, transportation & storage, diving, leisure industry, paintball, barbecue and many more.

Purity 
ROTAREX products can meet any standard of gas purity on the market, ranging from Industrial gases, Breathing quality and Ultra High Purity (UHP) gases (for the semiconductor industry for example)

See also 

 NxStage

 ApiJect Systems
 Vacuactivus
 Qardio

External links 
Company website

Medical device manufacturers
Engineering companies of Luxembourg
Manufacturing companies established in 1922
Lintgen
1922 establishments in Luxembourg